Dholak ke Geet songs are Urdu folk songs from Hyderabad Deccan, sung by Hyderabadi women during daily routine chores or during wedding festivities. The folk songs are also known as "Lok Geet" and were popular as Chakkhi ke Geet (chakkhi–mill and geet–songs), as they were sung when women used to grind grains at the mills. In modern days Dholak ke Geet are performed in pre-wedding occasions and upon family gathering on child birth.

History

Popular culture
Dholak ke Geet are the celebratory songs mostly performed during the five days marriage celebrations in Hyderabad region.

Further reading
 Hyderabadi Dholak ke Geet , by Sameena Begum (2019)

References

External links
 Radio Charminar
 Hyderabad dying folk-music
 songs to pep up weddings
 Nor reliable discussion

Indian folk music
Culture of Telangana